Groenekan is a village in the Dutch province of Utrecht. It is a part of the municipality of De Bilt, and lies about 3 km west of Bilthoven.

History 
It was first mentioned in 1607 as De Groene Kan, and is a reference to an inn with a green pot as display. Groenekan was a road village in a peat excavation area to the east of the Vecht. In 1840, it was home to 237 people.

In 1863, Groenekan was cut in two by the Utrecht-Hilversum railway line. Two railway stations were built, but closed in 1922 and 1938. Between 1867 and 1870, two forts were built near Groenekan as part of the Stelling van Amsterdam: Fort Voordorp and Fort Ruigenhoek. Between 1914 and 1918, and 1939 and 1940, bunkers were constructed around the village.

Gallery

See also
Rudolf van Reest

References

Populated places in Utrecht (province)
De Bilt